Eranadan or Aranadan is a Dravidian language spoken by several hundred people, predominantly in the region of Eranad, Malappuram district, Kerala, India. It is classified under the Malayalam languages. It is also known as Aranatan or Malappuram Bhasha.

References

Arabi Malayalam
Languages of Kerala